Nicotinate riboside kinase (ribosylnicotinic acid kinase, nicotinic acid riboside kinase, NRK1) is an enzyme with systematic name ATP:beta-D-ribosylnicotinate 5-phosphotransferase. This enzyme catalyses the following chemical reaction

 ATP + beta-D-ribosylnicotinate  ADP + nicotinate beta-D-ribonucleotide

The enzyme from yeast and human also acts as EC 2.7.1.22 (ribosylnicotinamide kinase).

References

External links 
 

EC 2.7.1